Borchmann is a surname. Notable people with the surname include:

Anke Borchmann (born 1954), German rower 
Svend Borchmann Hersleb (1784–1836), Norwegian professor 
Svend Borchmann Hersleb Vogt (1852–1923), Norwegian jurist 
Ernst Otto Borchmann, German rower

See also
Bochmann